The age of majority is the threshold of legal adulthood as recognized or declared in law. It is the moment when minors cease to be considered such and assume legal control over their persons, actions, and decisions, thus terminating the control and legal responsibilities of their parents or guardian over them. Most countries set the age of majority at 18, but some jurisdictions have a higher age and others lower. The word majority here refers to having greater years and being of full age as opposed to minority, the state of being a minor. The law in a given jurisdiction may not actually use the term "age of majority". The term typically refers to a collection of laws bestowing the status of adulthood. Those under the age of majority are referred to as minors and may be legally denied certain privileges or rights (e.g. the right to vote, buy alcohol, marry, sign a binding contract).

Age of majority should not be confused with the age of maturity, age of sexual consent, marriageable age, school-leaving age, drinking age, driving age, voting age, smoking age, gambling age, etc., which each may be independent of and set at a different age from the age of majority.

Explanation
The term "age of majority" can be confused with the similar concept of the age of license, which also pertains to the threshold of adulthood but in a much broader and more abstract manner. As a legal term of art, "license" means "permission", which leads to implications of a legally enforceable right or privilege. Thus, an age of license is an age at which one has legal permission from a given government to participate in certain activities or rituals. The age of majority, on the other hand, is a legal recognition that one is gradually becoming an adult, not necessarily stating that one is legally allowed to partake in any or all activities specified for adults.

Many ages of license are correlated to the age of majority to recognize the transition to legal adulthood, but they are nonetheless legally distinct concepts. One need not have attained the age of majority to have permission to exercise certain rights and responsibilities. Some ages of license may be higher, lower, or match the age of majority. For example, to purchase alcoholic beverages, the age of license is 21 in all U.S. states. Another example is the voting age, which prior to 1971 was 21 in the US, as was the age of majority in all or most states. After the voting age was lowered from 21 to 18, the age of majority was lowered to 18 in most states. In most US states, one may obtain a driver's license, consent to sexual activity, and gain full-time employment at age 16 even though the current age of majority is 18 in most states. In the Republic of Ireland the age of majority is 18, but one must be over 21 to stand for election to the Houses of the Oireachtas. Also, in Portugal the age of majority is 18, but one must be at least 25 years of age to run for public office and 35 to run for president. A child who is legally emancipated by a court of competent jurisdiction automatically attains to their maturity upon the signing of the court order. Only emancipation confers the status of maturity before a person has actually reached the age of majority.

In almost all places, minors who marry are automatically emancipated. Some places also do the same for minors who are in the armed forces or who have a certain degree or diploma. Minors who are emancipated may be able to choose where they live, sign contracts, and have control over their financial and medical decisions and generally make decisions free from parental control but are not exempt from age requirements set forth in law for other rights. For example, a minor can emancipate at 16 in the US (or younger depending on the state) but must still wait until 18 to vote or buy a firearm, and 21 to buy alcohol or tobacco.

The age 18 is identified as the age of adulthood in the Jewish Talmud relative to having sound judgement to make monetary decisions as a judge. Here, the Talmud says that every judgment Josiah, the sixteenth king of Judah (–609), issued from his coronation until the age of eighteen was reversed and he returned the money to the parties whom he judged liable, due to concern that in his youth he may not have judged the cases correctly. Other Jewish commentators have discussed whether age 13 or 18 is the age to make decisions in a Jewish Court.

The highest known age of majority historically was around age 30, during Roman times, where young males were placed under the guardianship of adults known as "Curatores" whose permission was needed to engage in formal acts and sign contracts until the youth reached turned 30. This was later lowered down to 25, and eventually 21 became the common age of majority. In some places historically, 23 or 27 could have also been this age. It has also gone down to as low as 14 or 15 years of age. They are somewhat arbitrarily chosen, but have rarely been designated outside of this approximate age range. It has not always been 18 or 21 but rather a variety of ages. In Medieval England, the age of majority was 15 but further raised to 21.

Since 2015, some countries have started to lower the voting age to 16. Some countries, like England and Wales, are even considering lowering the age of majority to 16, similar to how it already is in Cuba. The main arguments for lowering is that, on average, young people are much more educated currently (both because of better individual educational outcomes and being raised by more educated parents) than in the past (the same argument made in the 1970s when most countries lowered the age of majority from 21 to 18, which is the age still used presently for most countries). In addition, compared to the past, nowadays information is much more easily accessible as a result of the invention of the Internet, which can now be accessed through both a computer and also a smartphone.

Civil law

In many countries minors can be emancipated: depending on jurisdiction, this may happen through acts such as marriage, attaining economic self-sufficiency, obtaining an educational degree or diploma, or participating in a form of military service. In the United States, all states have some form of emancipation of minors.

The following list the age of majority in countries (or administrative divisions) in the order of lowest to highest:

Up to age 15

Iran
Indonesia

Yemen

Age 16

Cambodia
Cuba
Myanmar
Vietnam

Age 17

North Korea
Timor-Leste

Age 18

Age 19

Algeria
Canada
Nova Scotia
New Brunswick
British Columbia
Newfoundland and Labrador
Northwest Territories
Yukon
Nunavut
South Korea
United States
Alabama
Nebraska

Age 20
New Zealand
Thailand

Age 21 and above

Religious law
Religions have their own rules as to the age of maturity, when a child is regarded to be an adult, at least for ritual purposes:
Islam: Males are considered adults at 15 years old, while females are considered adults when they first menstruate. Both require a "mental maturity" to be attained for certain rituals, such as marriage (بلوغ النكاح).
Judaism: The age of majority is 13 years for boys (bar mitzvah) and 12 years for girls (bat mitzvah) for religious purposes. However, Jewish law follows the law of the land if there is a difference, such as in marriage age.
Christianity (only the Roman Catholic Church): 18 years.
Baha'i Faith: The spiritual age of maturity for every person born into a Baha'i family is 15. At 15, the person is old enough to decide for themselves what religion they want to be, so they could decide to stay a Baha'i or choose a different path. At this age, Baha'is are considered youth (as opposed to children before 15). Baha'i youth are 15–21 years old. Once a Baha'i turns 15, if they declare themselves a Baha'i, they are expected to recite a daily obligatory prayer and participate in the Fast. Baha'is can vote in Baha'i elections once they turn 18 (recently changed from 21).

Effects
 End of the parental authority and guardianship (in some legal systems it causes the pre-end of said institutions).
 Right to be considered legally capable.
 Right to freely manage and dispose of their goods, buy and sell properties and sign rental contracts.
 Right to inherit, manage the inheritance and, in countries where testaments exist, the possibility of testament.
 Right to receive bank credits and have bank accounts.
 Right to demand public authority.
 Possibility of being sued for not paying debts or other contracts.
 Possibility of being a member of the jury (in countries where trials use a jury).
 Possibility of being sued for child support and medical bills due to the birth of a child.

In some countries, reaching the age of majority carries other rights and obligations, although in other countries, these rights and obligations may be had before or after reaching the aforementioned age.
 Right to vote and to run for government office: although in some countries the minimum voting age may be lower and in other countries there are age restrictions to be elected to certain public offices.
 Right to drive a car: it may vary in some countries with respect to the age of majority.
 Right to drink alcoholic drinks, use drugs, like cocaine, heroin or marijuana and to smoke: In some countries, the legal drinking age and the smoking age differ from the age of adulthood.
 Right to buy and possess firearms or guns. 
 Right to work, pursue trade, profession or industry: may vary in some countries with respect to the age of majority.
 Right to freely leave the country (in some European countries like Italy, minors can leave the country unimpeded).
 In trials, the possibility of being treated as an adult, found guilty and sentenced to prison: It may vary in some countries with respect to the age of majority.

See also

 Adultism
 Adolescence
 Age of candidacy
 Age of consent
 Age of criminal responsibility
 Capacity (law)
 Emancipation of minors
 Legal drinking age
 Legal smoking age
 Marriageable age
 Mature minor doctrine
 Secular coming-of-age ceremony
 Voting age
 Youth rights
 Youth suffrage
 Youth

Notes

References

External links

"Age of Majority by State as of 2021". Policygenius, Age of Majority by State in 2022.

Adulthood
Legal fictions
Ageism